Knowlington Ottoway "Buddy" Burbage  (June 23, 1907 – August 30, 1989) was an American baseball outfielder in the Negro leagues. He played from 1928 to 1943 with multiple clubs.

References

External links
 and Baseball-Reference Black Baseball stats and Seamheads

Baltimore Black Sox players
Hilldale Club players
Pittsburgh Crawfords players
Bacharach Giants players
Newark Dodgers players
Homestead Grays players
Washington Black Senators players
Philadelphia Stars players
Brooklyn Royal Giants players
New York Black Yankees players
1907 births
1989 deaths
20th-century African-American sportspeople
Baseball outfielders